The A86 is a major road in Scotland. It runs from the Great Glen at Spean Bridge to Kingussie and the Cairngorms National Park via Loch Laggan. It is a primary route for its entire length.

The road was built as a parliamentary road by Thomas Telford in 1817 to link Kingussie to Fort William.

The road has a poor safety record, and has been assessed as medium to high risk of a serious or fatal accident by EuroRAP.

References

8-0086